Nessler or Neßler is a German surname. Notable people with the surname include:

Brad Nessler (born 1956), American sportscaster
Julius Neßler (1827–1905), German chemist
Martha Nessler Hayden, (born 1936), American painter, maiden name Nessler.
Karl Nessler (1872–1951), German-born American inventor
Viktor Nessler (1841–1890), Alsatian composer

See also
Nessler cylinder, laboratory tubes with a fixed volume
Nesler

German-language surnames